Mexigonus morosus is a species of jumping spider in the family Salticidae. It is found in the United States.

References

Further reading

 

Salticidae
Articles created by Qbugbot
Spiders described in 1888